Francis (Frank) Mwebesa is a Ugandan politician who serves as Minister of Trade, Industry and Cooperatives in the Cabinet of Uganda.

References 

Living people
Year of birth missing (living people)
Place of birth missing (living people)
Government ministers of Uganda
21st-century Ugandan politicians
Trade ministers of Uganda